Mid-Georgia Cogen is a 308 MW electric combined cycle gas turbine power plant located in Kathleen, Georgia.

The plant is primarily used for peaking power. It lies in the southern part of the Warner Robins metropolitan area.

History
The plant was developed by New Jersey headquartered GPU International as a merchant facility in the late 1990s. Prior to operation, a 50% stake was sold to Birmingham, Alabama based energy company Sonat. The plant became operational on June 1, 1998.
In 1999, the plant won Power Engineering magazine's Project of the Year award.

Through a series of mergers and sales, the plant is currently owned by Atlantic Power Corporation and NorthernStar Generation.

Technical details
The plant supplies process steam for use in food manufacturing. Electrical generation is sold to Georgia Power Company.
The plant uses two General Electric gas turbines and paired Nooter-Erickson heat recovery steam generators with a steam turbine to generate steam and electricity. The gas turbines may be fueled by natural gas or fuel oil.

References

Energy infrastructure completed in 1998
Natural gas-fired power stations in Georgia (U.S. state)
Oil-fired power stations in Georgia (U.S. state)
Cogeneration power stations in the United States
Buildings and structures in Houston County, Georgia